Un gioco per Eveline is a 1971 Italian film directed by Marcello Avallone.

Production
Director Marcello Avallone described his original desire for the film to make a film related to "the Fantastic, I wrote a 'noir', a genre we rarely did in Italy." Italian film historian and critic Roberto Curti stated that the film was not a film noir, but a ghost story. According to Erna Schurer, the film was funded by "a mafioso...he used to pay us by putting money inside a newspaper, I remember him coming over in weekends, carrying these small packages..."

The film was shot in Mondello, Sicilly in 1969.

Release
It took two years before Un gioco per Eveline was submitted to the Italian Board of Censors. was distributed theatrically in Italy by Panta Cinematografica on 16 July 1971. The film grossed a total of 43,833,000 Italian lire on its domestic release. Avallone was so disappointed by the results of the film, that he gave up on film and returned to television documentaries until the film Cugine mie in 1976.

References

Footnotes

Sources

External links
 

1970s ghost films
Italian ghost films
1970s Italian films